Dustin James Boyd (born July 16, 1986) is a Canadian-Kazakhstani professional ice hockey player who is currently an unrestricted free agent. He was most recently under contract with Barys Nur-Sultan of the Kontinental Hockey League (KHL).

Playing career 
After playing two seasons with the Moose Jaw Warriors of the Western Hockey League, Boyd was selected 98th overall in the third round of the 2004 NHL Entry Draft by the Calgary Flames. He made his NHL debut for the Flames on November 1, 2006, in a 3–2 away loss to the Detroit Red Wings. He played two games for the Flames before being returned to Omaha.

He scored his first NHL goal on January 6, 2007, on Marty Turco of the Dallas Stars. It was the game-winning goal. On Remembrance Day, November 11, 2008, Boyd received his first First Star of the Game in scoring two goals against the Toronto Maple Leafs in a 4–3 win.

In the 2009–10 season, his fourth with the Flames, he was traded to the Nashville Predators for a fourth round draft pick at the trade deadline on March 3, 2010.

On June 29, 2010, he was traded by the Predators, along with teammate Dan Ellis, to the Montreal Canadiens in exchange for Sergei Kostitsyn. Two days later he then signed as a free agent to a one-year contract with the Canadiens on July 1, 2010. On November 8, 2010, he was placed on waivers by the Canadiens. He cleared waivers and was sent down to their AHL affiliate, the Hamilton Bulldogs.  He remained under contract with Montreal and was called up and sent down once more.

On May 31, 2011, Boyd left the NHL and signed a one-year contract with Kazakh based KHL team, Barys Astana. Over the course of the next six seasons with Barys, Boyd became a cult player for the club alongside fellow imports Brandon Bochenski and Nigel Dawes.

Upon the retirement of Bochenski following the 2016–17 season, Boyd opted to leave Barys as a free agent but continue in the KHL in securing a two-year deal with Dynamo Moscow on July 19, 2017.

During the final year of his contract with Dynamo in the 2018–19 season, Boyd was scoreless in 5 appearances before leaving the club and returning to Barys Astana for the remainder of the campaign on September 27, 2018.

International play

Boyd was also a member of the Canadian gold-medal-winning team in the 2006 World Junior Ice Hockey Championships.

On March 24, 2016, the IIHF announced it had approved a request to allow Boyd, Brandon Bochenski and Nigel Dawes to play for Kazakhstan at the 2016 IIHF World Championship.

Personal life
Born and raised in Winnipeg, Manitoba, Boyd graduated from Westwood Collegiate in 2004.

Career statistics

Regular season and playoffs

International

Awards and honours

References

External links

1986 births
Living people
Barys Nur-Sultan players
Calgary Flames draft picks
Calgary Flames players
Canadian ice hockey centres
HC Dynamo Moscow players
Hamilton Bulldogs (AHL) players
Kazakhstani ice hockey players
Ice hockey people from Winnipeg
Montreal Canadiens players
Moose Jaw Warriors players
Nashville Predators players
Omaha Ak-Sar-Ben Knights players
Quad City Flames players